The Rajdhani Express is a series of passenger train service in India operated by Indian Railways connecting the national capital New Delhi with the capitals or the largest cities of various states. The word Rajdhani has been derived from the Devanagri script, which means Capital in English. This series of trains regularly gets the highest priority in the Indian Railways and is considered as its most premium train.

History 
In the Railway Budget of 1969–70, an introduction of a new superfast train was done which would connect Delhi to Kolkata in less than 18 hours. Until then, the fastest trains between these two cities usually took more than 20 hours. Thus, on 1 March 1969, the first Rajdhani Express left from New Delhi to Howrah at 1730 hrs and arrived at its destination at 1050 hrs on the next day, completing 1450 km in a record time of 17 hours 20 minutes. The return Rajdhani Express left Howrah Junction at 1700 hrs and arrived at New Delhi on its next day at 1020 hrs. The initial maximum speed of the Howrah Rajdhani Express was 120 km/hr. It was the only Rajdhani Express in India until 1972, when Indian Railways introduced another, the Bombay Rajdhani, now Mumbai Rajdhani Express, between Mumbai Central and New Delhi. Later on, with subsequent development of the tracks, other Rajdhani Expresses were introduced gradually, the latest Rajdhani Express as of now being the Mumbai CSMT–Hazrat Nizamuddin Rajdhani Express. However, Madhya Pradesh, Uttar Pradesh, Andhra Pradesh, Rajasthan, Mizoram, Uttrakhand, Haryana, Himachal Pradesh, Sikkim, Manipur, Meghalaya, Nagaland, and Punjab still do not have a Rajdhani Express terminating/originating from any of their major cities.

About 
Rajdhani express gets the highest priority on the Indian railway network. They are fully air-conditioned. Passengers are served optional meals (food price included in the train fare) during the journey. Depending on the duration and timings of the journey, these could include morning tea, breakfast, lunch, high tea and dinner. All Rajdhani Express trains offer three classes of accommodation: AC First Class (1A) with 2-berth and 4-berth coupès (with locking facility for privacy), AC 2-tier (2T) with open bays (4 berths/bay + 2 berths on the other side of the aisle of each bay), provided with curtains for privacy, and AC 3-tier (3T) with open bays (6 berths/bay + 2 berths on the other side of the aisle of each bay) without curtains.

Currently there are 24 pairs of trains, connecting New Delhi to important cities across the country. These trains have fewer stops than other express trains and halt only at prominent stations. Recently Dynamic pricing has been introduced on all Rajdhani express trains.

Routes 
There are currently 24 operational pairs of Rajdhani Express:

Tejas-Rajdhani Express 
Indian Railways started to upgrade Rajdhani Coaches to Tejas coaches. These trains are called the Tejas-Rajdhani Express This replaced its traditional LHB Rajdhani coaches.Soon all Rajdhani express will get brand new LHB Tejas Rakes.

Accidents
On 9 September 2002, At least 130 people were killed in an accident when the Howrah New Delhi Rajdhani derailed near Rafiganj, which was due to sabotage by a local Maoist terrorist group, the Naxalites. This is first Rajdhani train accident and one of the worst accident in Indian Railway.
October 27, 2009, Bhubaneswar Rajdhani was hijacked by hundreds of armed activists of the Maoist-backed People's Committee against Police Atrocities (PCPA) who clambered on to the rail track waving red flags and forcing the train to stop at Banshtala halt near Jhargram in West Midnapore district. They didn't harm the passengers and demanded the immediate release of their leader Chhatradhar Mahato. Almost five hours of drama came to an end with the Maoist-backed activists who had stalled the train, fleeing on the arrival of the CRPF.
On 18 April 2011, three coaches of Mumbai Rajdhani caught fire, including the pantry car. The accident happened at 2:20 am near the Thuriya station between Aalot and Vikramgarh near Ratlam. There were no casualties among the 900 passengers.
On 25 June 2014, at least four passengers were killed and eight injured when the New Delhi-Dibrugarh Rajdhani Express derailed at Goldin Ganj station near Chapra in suspected sabotage by Maoists. The train was heading towards Dibrugarh.
On the morning of 7th Sept 2017, at around 6.00 a.m. IST, a coach of the New Delhi-Ranchi Rajdhani Express derailed at the New Delhi station. According to railway spokesperson, no one was injured in the incident.
A week later after Ranchi Rajdhani accident, On 14th Sept 2017, another Rajdhani derailed. It was reported that a coach of Jammu Tawi-New Delhi Rajdhani Express derailed on Thursday at the New Delhi Railway Station. But no one was injured in the incident. The incident took place around 6.00am when the train was entering the platform.
On October 18, 2018, 2 coaches of Thiruvananthapuram Rajdhani derailed at the staffed level crossing near Ratlam when a speeding Truck collided with train due to brake failure. There were no injuries to train passengers but the truck driver was killed due to the collision. The Train continued journey after delay of 7 hours towards New Delhi.
On 3 Apr 2019, Two Coaches of Bhubaneswar Rajdhani Uncoupled on the Kathjodi river bridge which is 2.5 km away from Cuttack. Immediately the loco pilot stopped the train, No one was hurt when the bogies separated. Senior officers from the Bhubaneswar coach maintenance depot thoroughly checked the bogies at Cuttack railway station. The affected bogies, B/3 and B/4, were joined and the train resumed its onward journey towards New Delhi having an hour delay but reached right on time.
On 11 May 2019, A Fire Broke out at Generator Car of Bhubaneswar Rajdhani nearby Balasore, immediately railway staffs kept fire in under control, no casualties reported. The train continued journey having two hours delay.

Popular culture
Being one of the most popular train of India, the train saw its name featured as a title of a Bollywood movie, named as Rajdhani Express.

See also

References

External links 

Transport in Delhi

Railway services introduced in 1969